The Blessing is the final studio album by saxophonist David "Fathead" Newman, recorded in the year 2008 and released under HighNote label the following year (2009).

Reception

In his review on Allmusic, Ken Dryden states: "David "Fathead" Newman's last recording session took place just a few weeks before his death from pancreatic cancer. Although he obviously doesn't exhibit the power heard on his earlier recordings, like Charlie Rouse and Stan Getz before him (fellow cancer victims who recorded not long prior to their deaths), Newman more than holds his own throughout the date... Newman benefited from frequent recording opportunities with HighNote during his last years, and he went on top with this fine effort.". On All About Jazz, Andrew Velez observed: "What an apt name The Blessing is for David Newman's final recording before his death ended a long career last January (2009). He played for more than a decade with Ray Charles and alongside Herbie Mann, Aretha Franklin and Roy Ayers, among many others. For this last studio session he was in fine form".

Track listing 
 "SKJ" (Milt Jackson) – 6:23
 "Someone to Watch Over Me" (George Gershwin, Ira Gershwin) – 5:47
 "As Time Goes By" (Herman Hupfeld) – 4:55
 "Manhã de Carnaval" (Luiz Bonfá, Antônio Maria) – 5:27
 "Smile" (Charlie Chaplin) – 6:33
 "Romantic Night" (David Leonhardt) – 7:31
 "Chelsea Bridge" (Billy Strayhorn) – 5:59
 "Whispers of Contentment" (Leonhardt) – 5:24
 "The Blessing" (David "Fathead" Newman) – 7:07

Personnel 
David "Fathead" Newman – tenor saxophone, flute
Steve Nelson – vibraphone
David Leonhardt – piano 
Peter Bernstein – guitar
John Menegon – bass 
Yoron Israel – drums

References 

David "Fathead" Newman albums
2009 albums
HighNote Records albums
Albums recorded at Van Gelder Studio